The 1992–93 Washington Huskies men's basketball team represented the University of Washington for the 1992–93 NCAA Division I men's basketball season. Led by fourth-year head coach Lynn Nance, the Huskies were members of the Pacific-10 Conference and played their home games on campus at Hec Edmundson Pavilion in Seattle, Washington.

They ended the season on a four-game losing streak, concluding with a home loss to rival  There was no conference tournament this season; last played in 1990, it resumed in 2002.

Alumnus Nance resigned on March 19, and was succeeded in April by Bob Bender, the head coach at

References

External links
Sports Reference – Washington Huskies: 1992–93 basketball season

Washington Huskies men's basketball seasons
Washington Huskies
Washington
Washington